Libertatea (Romanian for "Liberty") may refer to:

Media
 Libertatea, a Romanian daily tabloid established in 1989
 Libertatea (Serbia), a Romanian-language Serbian weekly based in Pančevo

Places
 Libertatea, a village in Călăraşi commune in Romania
 Libertatea, a village in Dichiseni commune in Romania